Donadio or Donadío is a surname. Notable people with the surname include:

Candida Donadio (1929-2001), American literary agent
Giulio Donadio (1889–1951), Italian actor and film director
Giovanni Francesco Donadio (1449-1530), nicknamed "Mormando", Italian architect and Master organist
Sebastián Donadío (born 1972), Argentine track cyclist

See also
List of The Passage characters#Alicia Donadio